Kevin Facundo Gutiérrez (born 3 June 1997) is an Argentine professional footballer who plays as a midfielder for Defensa y Justicia on loan from Racing Club.

Club career
Gutiérrez joined Racing Club's youth academy in 2004. Thirteen years later, he made his professional debut with Racing Club in December 2017, having been moved into the first-team early in the month. His debut arrived on 2 December in a 2–2 draw with Newell's Old Boys. Gutiérrez was loaned to Gimnasia y Esgrima in August 2018. After just one appearance, which came in the Copa Argentina final defeat to Rosario Central, he terminated his loan with the club on 22 January 2019, subsequently leaving Racing Club on loan again days later to Godoy Cruz. Thirty total appearances followed.

January 2020 saw Rosario Central complete the loan signing of Gutiérrez. He wouldn't appear in the league for Rosario, but did feature in a Copa de la Superliga defeat to Colón on 16 March.

International career
In September 2019, Gutiérrez received a call-up to Fernando Batista's Argentina U23s for a friendly with Bolivia.

Career statistics
.

References

External links

1997 births
Living people
Sportspeople from Lanús
Argentine footballers
Association football midfielders
Argentine Primera División players
Racing Club de Avellaneda footballers
Club de Gimnasia y Esgrima La Plata footballers
Godoy Cruz Antonio Tomba footballers
Rosario Central footballers
Defensa y Justicia footballers